In physics, the proton-to-electron mass ratio, μ or β, is the rest mass of the proton (a baryon found in atoms) divided by that of the electron (a lepton found in atoms), a dimensionless quantity, namely:
μ = 

The number in parentheses is the measurement uncertainty on the last two digits, corresponding to a relative standard uncertainty of

Discussion
μ is an important fundamental physical constant because:
 Baryonic matter consists of quarks and particles made from quarks, like protons and neutrons. Free neutrons have a half-life of 613.9 seconds. Electrons and protons appear to be stable, to the best of current knowledge. (Theories of proton decay predict that the proton has a half life on the order of at least 1032 years. To date, there is no experimental evidence of proton decay.);
 Because they are stable, are components of all normal atoms, and determine their chemical properties, the proton is the most prevalent baryon, while the electron is the most prevalent lepton;
 The proton mass mp is composed primarily of gluons, and of the quarks (the up quark and down quark) making up the proton. Hence mp, and therefore the ratio μ, are easily measurable consequences of the strong force. In fact, in the chiral limit, mp is proportional to the QCD energy scale, ΛQCD. At a given energy scale, the strong coupling constant αs is related to the QCD scale (and thus μ) as

where β0 = −11 + 2n/3, with n being the number of flavors of quarks.

Variation of μ over time

Astrophysicists have tried to find evidence that μ has changed over the history of the universe. (The same question has also been asked of the fine structure constant.) One interesting cause of such change would be change over time in the strength of the strong force.

Astronomical searches for time-varying μ have typically examined the Lyman series and Werner transitions of molecular hydrogen which, given a sufficiently large redshift, occur in the optical region and so can be observed with ground-based spectrographs.

If μ were to change, then the change in the wavelength λi of each rest frame wavelength can be parameterised as:

where Δμ/μ is the proportional change in μ and Ki is a constant which must be calculated within a theoretical (or semi-empirical) framework.

Reinhold et al. (2006) reported a potential 4 standard deviation variation in μ by analysing the molecular hydrogen absorption spectra of quasars Q0405-443 and Q0347-373. They found that . King et al. (2008) reanalysed the spectral data of Reinhold et al. and collected new data on another quasar, Q0528-250. They estimated that , different from the estimates of Reinhold et al. (2006).

Murphy et al. (2008) used the inversion transition of ammonia to conclude that  at redshift . Kanekar (2011) used deeper observations of the inversion transitions of ammonia in the same system at  towards 0218+357 to obtain .

Bagdonaite et al.
Kanekar et al. Using three methanol lines with similar frequencies to reduce systematic effects, Kanekar et al. (2015) obtained .

Note that any comparison between values of Δμ/μ at substantially different redshifts will need a particular model to govern the evolution of Δμ/μ. That is, results consistent with zero change at lower redshifts do not rule out significant change at higher redshifts.

See also
 Koide formula

Footnotes

References
 
 
 
 
 
 

Fundamental constants
Proton
Dimensionless numbers
Electron